Japan Photographic Society may refer to:

Japan Photographic Society (19th century)
Japan Photographic Society (1924–)

See also 
 Japan Professional Photographers Society
 Photographic Society of Japan